Monochamus guerryi is a species of beetle in the family Cerambycidae. It was described by Maurice Pic in 1903. It is known from Myanmar, China, and Thailand. It feeds on Pinus kesiya, Castanea mollissima, Malus pumila, and Quercus glauca.

References

guerryi
Beetles described in 1903